American Heart is a 1992 drama film directed by Martin Bell and starring Jeff Bridges and Edward Furlong. It was nominated for the Independent Spirit Award in a number of categories and won in the Best Male Lead category.

Plot
Jack Kelson has just been released from prison in Seattle after serving a five-year sentence for robbing a jewelry store. His 14-year-old son Nick, whose mother has been dead for many years, is in desperate need of a father and arrives at the prison to meet him, but he is rebuffed. Nick persists on tagging along with Jack and the two take up residence at a cheap hotel. Over time, the two settle into a push-and-pull relationship. Jack tries to resist the pleas of his ex-partner Randy to return to robbery and finds a job downtown as a window washer. He also makes a phone call to a woman named Charlotte and they meet up at the hotel. It is revealed Charlotte had been writing letters to Jack while he was incarcerated, through the prison's publication American Heart where prisoners can solicit correspondence. Jack talks about moving to Alaska for a new life, but is not sure if he wants to bring Nick with him. Just as it appears Nick will be joining his father, he feels increasingly drawn to the life of crime his father is trying to avoid.

Cast 

 Jeff Bridges as Jack Kelson
 Edward Furlong as Nick Kelson
 Lucinda Jenney as Charlotte
 Tracey Kapisky as Molly
 Don Harvey as Rainey

Production 
American Heart was filmed in Seattle from August 1991 to October 1991. Elements of the screenplay for American Heart were based on material originally covered in Martin Bell's documentary film Streetwise, such as the relationship between Dewayne and his father. To prepare for the role, Jeff Bridges worked closely with Edward Bunker, an ex-con and author of the novel No Beast So Fierce which inspired the 1978 film Straight Time. Bridges also worked out with ex-cons to get his body in the shape of a prisoner. Edward Furlong was cast prior to the release of his debut film Terminator 2 when photographer Mary Ellen Mark did a photo essay on kid actors.

Reception

Release 
The film had its world premiere at the Toronto International Film Festival on September 17, 1992. It was then given a limited theatrical release in the United States on May 7, 1993.

Critical reception 
American Heart received positive reviews from critics. On Rotten Tomatoes, it has an approval rating of 80% based on 15 reviews. 

Bridges received widespread praise for his performance. Janet Maslin of The New York Times wrote, "It's time to recognize Mr. Bridges as the most underappreciated great actor of his generation. Although he approaches this potentially showy role without fanfare or ostentation, he has managed to transform himself to an astonishing degree." Of Furlong, Maslin said he "brings great dignity and a powerful sense of yearning to Nick's efforts to win over his father. He is equally good at capturing the frustration that sets in once Nick realizes what an uphill battle this will be." 

Kevin Thomas of the Los Angeles Times also gave a positive review, praising the film's "spiky humor" and opining, "Not since Straight Time...has there here been a film that more convincingly depicted the plight of the ex-con in his struggle to earn an honest living than the engaging 'American Heart.'" He also said the film "might have been a richer, more encompassing experience had its makers not so easily equated being downbeat with being realistic and honest."

Awards and nominations 
American Heart was nominated for five Independent Spirit Awards including Best First Feature for Martin Bell, Best Supporting Female for Lucinda Jenney, Best Supporting Male for Edward Furlong, and Best Cinematography for James R. Bagdonas. The film won for Best Male Lead for Jeff Bridges.

References

External links

American Heart at AllMovie

American Heart at Mary Ellen Mark 

1992 films
American drama films
American independent films
1990s English-language films
1992 drama films
Films scored by James Newton Howard
1992 independent films
1990s American films
Films set in Seattle
Films shot in Seattle
Films about father–son relationships